is a former Japanese football player. She played for Japan national team.

National team career
Shiraishi was born on September 24, 1964. In June 1981, when she was 17 years old, she was selected Japan national team for 1981 AFC Championship. At this competition, on June 7, she debuted against Chinese Taipei. This match is Japan team first match in International A Match. She played in all 3 matches at this championship. She played 4 games for Japan include this competition in 1981.

National team statistics

References

1963 births
Living people
Japanese women's footballers
Japan women's international footballers
Women's association footballers not categorized by position